Saint-Vaast-d'Équiqueville is a commune in the Seine-Maritime department in the Normandy region in north-western France.

Geography

Population

Places of interest
 The manorhouse du Doyen (1657)
 The church of St. Vaast, dating from the eleventh century 
 A sixteenth-century stone cross

People
 The artist Auguste Durst (1842–1930) stayed here from 1902 to 1907.

See also
Communes of the Seine-Maritime department

References

Communes of Seine-Maritime